Kensington Palace is a royal residence set in Kensington Gardens, in the Royal Borough of Kensington and Chelsea in London, England. It has been a residence of the British royal family since the 17th century, and is currently the official London residence of the Prince and Princess of Wales, the Duke and Duchess of Gloucester, the Duke and Duchess of Kent, and Prince and Princess Michael of Kent.

Today, the State Rooms are open to the public and managed by the independent charity Historic Royal Palaces, a nonprofit organisation that does not receive public funds. The offices and private accommodation areas of the palace remain the responsibility of the Royal Household and are maintained by the Royal Household Property Section.  The palace also displays many paintings and other objects from the Royal Collection.

History

King William III and Queen Mary II

Kensington Palace was originally a two-storey Jacobean mansion built by Sir George Coppin in 1605 in the village of Kensington.

Shortly after William and Mary assumed the throne as joint monarchs in 1689, they began searching for a residence better suited for the comfort of the asthmatic William, as Whitehall Palace was too near the River Thames, with its fog and floods, for William's fragile health.

In the summer of 1689, William and Mary bought the property, then known as Nottingham House, from the Secretary of State Daniel Finch, 2nd Earl of Nottingham, for £20,000. They instructed Sir Christopher Wren, Surveyor of the King's Works, to begin an immediate expansion of the house. In order to save time and money, Wren kept the structure intact and added a three-storey pavilion at each of the four corners, providing more accommodation for the King and Queen and their attendants. The Queen's Apartments were in the north-west pavilion and the King's in the south-east.

Wren re-oriented the house to face west, building north and south wings to flank the approach, made into a proper cour d'honneur that was entered through an archway surmounted by a clock tower. The palace was surrounded by straight cut solitary lawns, and formal stately gardens, laid out with paths and flower beds at right angles, in the Dutch fashion. The royal court took residence in the palace shortly before Christmas 1689. For the next seventy years, Kensington Palace was the favoured residence of British monarchs, although the official seat of the Court was and remains at St. James's Palace, which has not been the actual royal residence in London since the 17th century.

Additional improvements soon after included Queen Mary's extension of her apartments, by building the Queen's Gallery. After a fire in 1691, the King's Staircase was rebuilt in marble and a Guard Chamber was constructed, facing the foot of the stairs. William had constructed the South Front, to the design of Nicholas Hawksmoor, which included the Kings' Gallery where he hung many works from his picture collection. Mary II died of smallpox in the palace in 1694. In 1702, William suffered a fall from a horse at Hampton Court and was brought to Kensington Palace, where he died shortly afterwards from pneumonia.

Queen Anne

After William III's death, the palace became the residence of Queen Anne. She had Christopher Wren complete the extensions that William and Mary had begun, resulting in the section known as the Queen's Apartments, with the Queen's Entrance, and the plainly decorated Wren designed staircase, that featured shallow steps so that Anne could walk down gracefully. These were primarily used by the Queen to give access between the private apartments and gardens.

Queen Anne's most notable contribution to the palace were the gardens. She commissioned the Hawksmoor designed Orangery, modified by John Vanbrugh, that was built for her in 1704. The level of decoration of the interior, including carved detail by Grinling Gibbons, reflects its intended use, not just as a greenhouse, but as a place for entertaining. A magnificent  baroque parterre, with sections of clipped scrolling designs punctuated by trees formally clipped into cones, was laid out by Henry Wise, the royal gardener.

Kensington Palace was the setting of the final argument between Sarah, Duchess of Marlborough, and Queen Anne. The Duchess, who was known for being outspoken and manipulative, was jealous of the attention the Queen was giving to Abigail Masham, Baroness Masham. Along with the previous insensitive acts of the Duchess after the death of Anne's husband, Prince George of Denmark, who had died at Kensington Palace in October 1708, their friendship came to an abrupt end on 6 April 1710, with the two seeing each other for the last time after an argument in the Queen's Closet. Queen Anne died at Kensington Palace on 1 August 1714.

King George I and King George II

George I spent lavishly on new royal apartments, creating three new state rooms known as the Privy Chamber, the Cupola Room and the Withdrawing Room. He hired the unknown William Kent in 1722 to decorate the state rooms, which he did with elaborately painted trompe l'oeil ceilings and walls. The Cupola Room was Kent's first commission for the King. The octagonal coffering in the domed ceiling was painted in gold and blue, and terminated in a flat panel decorated with the Star of the Order of the Garter. The walls and woodwork were painted brown and gold to contrast with the white marble pilasters, doorways and niches which were surmounted with gilded statuary. 

George I was pleased with his work, and between 1722, and 1727, Kent oversaw the decoration and picture hanging for all of the royal apartments at Kensington Palace. Kent's final commission was the King's Grand Staircase which he painted with 45 intriguing courtiers from the Georgian court, including the King's Turkish servants Mahomet and Mustapha, Peter 'the wild boy' as well as himself along with his mistress. King George I enlarged the palace with the addition of an apartment, built on the north-west side, to house his mistress, Melusine von der Schulenburg, Duchess of Kendal.

The last reigning monarch to use Kensington Palace was George II, who did not undertake any major structural changes to the palace during his reign, and left the running of the palace to his wife Queen Caroline. At the request of the Queen, Charles Bridgeman, successor to Henry Wise as royal gardener, swept away the outmoded parterres and redesigned Kensington Gardens in a form that is still recognisable today: his remaining features are The Serpentine, the basin called the Round Pond, and the Broad Walk. After the death of his wife, George II neglected many rooms and the palace fell into disrepair. King George II died at Kensington Palace on 25 October 1760.

Notable palace residents

19th century
With the accession of King George III in 1760, Kensington Palace was only used for minor royalty. The sixth son of George III, Prince Augustus Frederick, Duke of Sussex, was allocated apartments in the south-west corner of Kensington Palace in 1805 known as Apartment 1.  He was interested in the arts and science and amassed a huge library that filled ten rooms and comprised over fifty thousand volumes.  He had a large number of clocks, and a variety of singing birds that were free to fly around his apartments. He was elected as president of the Royal Society and gave receptions in his apartments at Kensington Palace to men of science. The expense they incurred induced him to resign the presidency, as he preferred to employ the money in making additions to his library.

The Duke of Sussex caused quite a scandal when he married twice in contravention of the Royal Marriages Act 1772, because it had not been approved by the King. His second wife, Cecilia Underwood, Duchess of Inverness, was never titled or recognised as the Duchess of Sussex. However, she was created Duchess of Inverness in her own right in 1840. The Duke died at Kensington Palace in 1843. As he had lived beyond his means and amassed substantial debts, his possessions, including the library, were sold after his death. The Duchess of Inverness continued to reside at Kensington Palace until her death in 1873.

Prince Edward, Duke of Kent and Strathearn, the fourth son of King George III, was allocated two floors of rooms in the south-east corner of the palace, below the State Apartments, which he renovated for his use. The apartments were next to his near-blind sister Princess Sophia. His daughter, Alexandrina Victoria, was born on 24 May 1819, and her christening conducted in the Cupola Room the following month. The Duke of Kent and Strathearn died nine months after the birth of his daughter.

She grew up in the confines of the palace in an unhappy and lonely childhood as a result of the Kensington System adopted by her mother, Victoria, Duchess of Kent, and the domineering Sir John Conroy, her mother's comptroller of the household. Princess Sophia fell under the sway of Conroy, who took advantage of her senility and blindness. She frequently served as his spy on the Kensington household, as well as on her two elder brothers. Conroy squandered most of her money until she died in 1848, at Kensington Palace.

In 1837, Princess Alexandrina Victoria was awakened to be told that her uncle, King William IV, had died and that she was now queen. She took the regnal name of Victoria and held her first privy council in the Red Saloon at the palace. The Queen promptly moved to Buckingham Palace. She granted rooms in Kensington Palace to her family and retired retainers, which included the Duke and Duchess of Teck, parents of Queen Mary (great-grandmother of King Charles III), who was born at Kensington Palace on 26 May 1867. In 1873, Princess Louise, Duchess of Argyll, resided in the apartment with her husband, the Marquess of Lorne, departing after he was appointed Governor-General of Canada for Rideau Hall. 

The couple returned after his tenure, and Louise used her art studio at the apartments to design and sculpt the Statue of Queen Victoria, Kensington Palace. The apartment became her primary residence upon her widowhood in 1914 before her death in 1939. In 1955, the apartment was given to the widowed Princess Marina, Duchess of Kent, and her children until her death in 1969.  Louise's younger sister, Princess Beatrice, was given by Queen Victoria the apartments once occupied by the Queen and her mother below the State Apartments.

20th century
During World War I, George V allowed a number of rooms in the palace to be used by those working for Irish POWs and Irish soldiers at the front, and decreed that its royal inhabitants adhere to the same rations as everyone else. The royal inhabitants now included Princess Helena, Duchess of Albany; Princess Alice, Countess of Athlone; and the Earl of Athlone. In 1921, upon widowhood, Victoria, Marchioness of Milford Haven, moved into a grace-and-favour apartment at Kensington Palace. During this period, her grandson, Prince Philip, lived with her at times as she was in charge of his education.  As a result of the number of royal relatives residing there during the 1920s and 1930s, Edward VIII called the palace "the aunt heap."

Kensington Palace was severely damaged during The Blitz of 1940. It was hit by an incendiary bomb that exploded in the north side of Clock Court, damaging many of the surrounding buildings including the State Apartments, particularly the Queen's Apartments. The Headquarters of Personnel Section occupied Apartment 34, and as a result the garden was overrun with anti-aircraft guns, sandbags and trenches.  Repairs to the palace were not completed for several years, but after the war, Prince Philip stayed with his grandmother in the lead-up to his 1947 marriage with Princess Elizabeth, later to become Queen Elizabeth II.  

With the bombing damage and the deaths of Princess Louise and Princess Beatrice, the palace entered a period of neglect. During the 1950s, residents of the palace included the Master of the Horse, Henry Somerset, 10th Duke of Beaufort, who had married Lady Mary Cambridge - a niece of Queen Mary as the daughter of the 1st Marquess of Cambridge, Sir Alan Lascelles, Queen Elizabeth's private secretary and Princess Alice, Countess of Athlone, who lived in the palace until her death in 1981. 

In 1955, the widowed Princess Marina, Duchess of Kent, moved into Apartment 1, with her children, which had been vacant since Princess Louise's death in 1939. It was at this time that the apartment was divided and Apartment 1A created. The stylish Duchess of Kent continued to live in the apartment until her death at Kensington Palace of a brain tumour in 1968.

Following their wedding on 6 May 1960, Princess Margaret, Countess of Snowdon, sister of Queen Elizabeth II, and the Earl of Snowdon, moved into Apartment 10, while they set about transforming the much larger Apartment 1A to new designs. In 1960, Kensington Palace was under the auspices of the Department of the Environment. The renovation had to be carried out under the strictest of budgets, with the eventual costs coming in at £85,000, approximately £1.5 million today. By 1962, the whole interior had been gutted. All the floors, except the attic floor, were removed to deal with rising damp. The resulting modern apartment consisted of the main reception rooms, three principal bedrooms and dressing rooms, three principal bathrooms, the nursery accommodation, nine staff bedrooms, four staff bathrooms, two staff kitchens and two staff sitting rooms. 

Twenty ancillary rooms included a linen store, a luggage room, a drying room, a glass pantry and a photographic dark room for Lord Snowdon. The house in 18th century style, had a modern colour palette, with the bold use of colours including Margaret's favourites, pink and kingfisher blue. The house was largely designed by Snowdon and Princess Margaret with the assistance of the theatre designer Carl Toms, one-time assistant to Oliver Messel, Lord Snowdon's uncle, and a close friend of the royal couple. The royal couple moved into Apartment 1A on 4 March 1963, prior to the birth of their daughter, Lady Sarah, who was born at the palace the following year.

Prince and Princess Richard of Gloucester, later Duke and Duchess of Gloucester, moved into Apartment 1 after their marriage in 1972, the 21-room house previously occupied by Princess Marina, where they subsequently raised their three children. In 1994, after the Gloucesters had to give up their country home, Barnwell Manor, for financial reasons, they moved the Duke's aged mother Princess Alice, Duchess of Gloucester, from Barnwell to Kensington Palace where she died in her sleep on 29 October 2004 at age 102. She holds the record as the oldest person in the history of the British royal family.

The Queen gave the keys to the five-bedroom, five-reception grace-and-favour Apartment 10 to Prince and Princess Michael of Kent on the occasion of their marriage in 1978.  Their children, Lord Frederick Windsor and Lady Gabriella Kingston, were raised at the residence. In 2008, there was controversy when it was claimed that the couple paid a rent of only £70 per week, though they fulfilled no official duties on behalf of the Queen. The British Monarchy Media Centre denied these reports and stated that, "The Queen is paying the rent for Prince and Princess Michael of Kent's apartment at a commercial rate of £120,000 annually from her own private funds... This rent payment by The Queen is in recognition of the Royal engagements and work for various charities which Prince and Princess Michael of Kent have undertaken at their own expense, and without any public funding." 

It was announced that from 2010, that Prince and Princess Michael would begin paying rent of £120,000 a year out of their own funds to continue living in the apartment. In 1996, Prince Michael's older brother, Prince Edward, Duke of Kent and his wife Katharine moved into Wren House on the Kensington Palace estate.

In 1981, in the part of the palace that King George I had built for his mistress, the Duchess of Kendal, Apartments 8 and 9 were combined to create the London residence of the newly married Prince of Wales and his wife, Diana, Princess of Wales. It remained the official residence of the Princess after their divorce until her death. Her sons, Princes William and Harry, were raised in Kensington Palace and went to local nursery and pre-preparatory schools in Notting Hill, which is a short drive away. According to Andrew Morton, the palace was a "children's paradise" with its long passageways, a helicopter pad, and many outdoor gardens, including one on the roof where the family spent many hours.

Several notable courtiers live or have lived at The Old Barracks building, on the southern end of the palace. Notable residents include: Paul Burrell, Princess Diana's butler; Sir Miles Hunt-Davies, Private Secretary to Prince Philip; Jane, Lady Fellowes, Diana's sister, and her husband Robert Fellowes, Baron Fellowes, Private Secretary to The Queen.

Diana's interview with Martin Bashir for the BBC's Panorama programme was recorded in Diana's sitting room at the palace.
The Princess's coffin spent its last night in London at the palace.

On the morning of 6 September 1997, a tenor bell signalled the departure of the funeral cortege carrying the coffin from the palace on a gun carriage to Westminster Abbey for the ceremony. Her residence was stripped bare and lay vacant for 10 years after her death. It was split back into two apartments, with Apartment 8 being used by four of Charles's charities and Apartment 9 becoming home to the Chief of Defence Staff.

21st century

Following their marriage in 2011, the then-Duke and Duchess of Cambridge used Nottingham Cottage as their London residence. They moved into the four-storey, 20-room Apartment 1A, the former residence of Princess Margaret, in 2013. Renovations took 18 months at a cost of £4.5 million, including new heating, electrics and plastering, and the removal of asbestos that required nearly everything to be stripped out internally, as well as a new roof. 

Kensington Palace became the Duke and Duchess's main residence in 2017, moving from their country home, Anmer Hall. The apartment covers four storeys, with three bedrooms, two nurseries and five reception rooms. In 2016, Diana's former residence, Apartment 8, was turned into office space for the couple's staff, official duties and charity work. The Duke and Duchess have hosted multiple engagements, receptions, and meetings at the palace.

On 28 March 2012, it was announced that Prince Harry had moved his residence from Clarence House to a one-bedroom apartment at Kensington Palace. From 2013, he resided at Nottingham Cottage. The Duke and Duchess of Sussex continued to live at the property until the birth of their son in spring 2019. 

In April 2018, Princess Eugenie moved from St James's Palace into Ivy Cottage at Kensington Palace. She lived there with her husband Jack Brooksbank until November 2020. In September 2019, the Duke and Duchess of Gloucester, previously residents of Apartment 1, moved to the Old Stables, a smaller home located within the palace's estate.

Interior and grounds
Kensington Palace contains many public and private apartments and residences within the building and its grounds. The palace houses fifty total residents. Aside from royals, it also hosts members of the military, courtiers, staff, and citizens who pay market rent.

King and Queen's State Apartments

The King's and Queen's State Apartments are state rooms and private apartments historically used by various monarchs and consorts. The King's State Apartments were used for diplomatic audiences and meetings, described as "opulent"  and "surprisingly sparse". The Queen's State Apartments were a domestic residence typically used by consorts to live in and entertain. The state apartments were first opened to the public in 1899. The museum closed intermittently during the conflicts of the First and Second World Wars before reopening permanently in 1949.

The entryway to the King's State Apartments is marked by the King's Staircase, decorated with a painting by William Kent depicting George I's royal court, completed in 1974. The apartment possess several reception rooms. The Presence Chamber, features a limewood fireplace where the monarch received ministers. The Privy Chamber, was one of Queen Caroline's favourite entertaining spaces. The Cupola Room, has been described as the "most splendidly decorated room in the palace", also by Kent.

The King's Drawing Room, where courtiers would come "in search of power and patronage", features a copy of Venus and Cupid by Giorgio Vasari, which Caroline attempted to have removed to no avail. The King's Gallery, built for William III, is decorated with red accents and golden ornaments, used for exercise and displaying paintings. Featuring numerous works by Kent, it hosts Charles I at the Hunt by Anthony van Dyck.

The Queen's State Apartments consist of the rooms where Mary II and later royal consorts resided. The Queen's Staircase is "deliberately plainer" than its counterpart, accessible to the gardens. The Queen's Gallery, built in 1693, was previously filled with Turkish carpets and oriental artifacts, designed as a place for Mary to fulfill "simple pastimes such as walking, reading, and needlework." The Queen's Dining Room is where Mary and William would take their meals together in private, featuring 17th-century paneling. The Queen's Drawing Room features decor from China and Japan, and features William and Mary's intertwined monogram carved into the crown molding. Mary's bedroom, where she entertained friends, is included in the apartments.

Apartment 1
Apartment 1 is a royal residence located in the southwest wing of the palace. During its vacancy from 1939 and 1955, it was divided into two, with a separate Apartment 1 and Apartment 1A within the space. The apartment has 21 rooms and a walled garden, as well as adjoining doors to Apartment 1A. It has been described as a “lovely big apartment”; Apartment 1 is the second-biggest residence in the palace. Previous interior rooms have included the "sizable" library of Prince Augustus Frederick, Duke of Sussex, and the sculpting studio of Princess Louise, Duchess of Argyll.

Apartment 1A 
Apartment 1A is a royal residence, covering four storeys, with twenty rooms total. It has five reception rooms, each with fireplaces, as well as three bedrooms, dressing rooms and two nurseries. The upper level has nine staff bedrooms, while the basement holds a luggage room, gym, and laundry quarters. There are three kitchens, one for family use and two for the staff. The residence overlooks a large, walled-in garden, hidden from public view in the palace's museum wing by frosted windows. 

The entrance hall has intricate crown moulding and black-and-white tiling. The apartment features art and furnishings from the Royal Collection. The Duchess of Cambridge decorated the space with furniture from IKEA, with the interior featuring "warm beiges and floral pillows", gold trim upholstery, and detailed carpeting.

Apartments 8 & 9
Apartments 8 & 9 are two conjoined chambers situated on the northern-most section of the main palatial building. The apartment covers three storeys. During its use as a residence, the two-room nursery covered the entirety of the top floor. Other spaces included two reception rooms: a drawing room doubling as Diana's office, a sitting room with a television, and a formal dining room. In 1981, the apartments were combined to create a family home for Charles, Prince of Wales, and Diana, Princess of Wales.  

The residence had a helicopter pad, and many outdoor gardens, including one on the roof and a greenhouse where the family spent many hours. Diana decorated the residence in "bold patterns and lush fabrics", as well as floral wallpaper and a mix of modern and antique furniture, upholstered with golden laquer. From 1997, the apartments have been used as office space for various groups, charities, and staff.

Apartment 10
Apartment 10 is a residence situated in the north-east section of the palace, in the public gardens. The three-storey apartment holds five bedrooms and five reception rooms. Former tenant Princess Margaret described it as "the doll’s house".

Wren House

Named for architect Christopher Wren, Wren House residence is near a cluster of cottages on the grounds of the palace, located north of the main building. It has five bedrooms and five reception rooms. The cottage covers two storeys, and has been noted as one of the more modest residences within the palace. Wren House is said to have the "best view" of the palace's walled gardens.

Nottingham Cottage

Nottingham Cottage is a residence near a cluster of cottages on the grounds of the palace, located north of the main building. Described as a "cosy property", it contains two bedrooms, two reception rooms, and a small garden.

Ivy Cottage

Ivy Cottage is a residence near a cluster of cottages on the grounds of the palace, located north of the main building. The cottage holds three bedrooms. While in residence, Princess Eugenie was reported to have renovated the residence and "brightened the cottage up with lots of pops of colour" and various art pieces.

Old Stables
The Old Stables is a residence near a cluster of cottages on the grounds of the palace, located north of the main building. During Sir Tommy Lascelles' occupation, it was described as "lavishly decorated". During the residence of Prince Richard, Duke of Gloucester and Birgitte, Duchess of Gloucester, the house was decorated with "old wooden furniture" and "bright turquoise walls".

King's Kitchen Cottages and the Upper Lodge
The King's Kitchen Cottages and Upper Lodge make up staff residences.

Chapel
The Kensington Palace Chapel was built in the 1830s, used for private family services and occasions. Described as the "heart" of the palace, it was converted into residential space before being restored as a chapel by a conservation company in 2002. The space is approximately 9 meters long, including a "variety of antique features" and oak wall panelling. Renaissance era art pieces from the Royal Collection adorn the room, alongside a 19th-century brass hung chandelier. Family events that have taken place at the chapel include the 2004 wedding of Lady Davina Windsor, and the 2015 christening of Isabella Windsor, daughter of Lord Frederick Windsor and Lady Frederick Windsor,.

As a tourist attraction/other uses

By the end of the 19th century, the State Rooms were severely neglected. The brickwork was decaying and the woodwork was infested with dry rot. Calls were made for the palace to be demolished, but Queen Victoria declared that "while she lived, the palace in which she was born should not be destroyed". In 1897, Parliament was persuaded to pay for the restoration which was completed two years later. The State Rooms were opened to the public on the Queen's birthday, 24 May 1899. This began the palace's dual role as a private home to royalty and a public museum. 

Queen Mary was instrumental in opening the State Apartments as a temporary location for the London Museum, now known as the Museum of London, from 1911 to 1914. The State Apartments were filled with showcases, some containing hundreds of objects including 18th-century costumes and dresses worn by Queen Victoria, Queen Alexandra and Queen Mary. The museum returned from 1950 to 1976 before it moved to its next home on London Wall.

In 1989 care for the Kensington Palace State Rooms was contracted out to Historic Royal Palaces Agency, a non-departmental public body, on behalf of the Department of the Environment. Historic Royal Palaces Agency became an independent charity in 1998 called Historic Royal Palaces (HRP), which is dependent on charitable giving for management of the site. Under HRP the Kensington Palace State Rooms underwent a two-year, £12 million renovation, underwritten with contributions from the Heritage Lottery Fund as well as other public and private donations. New uniforms for staff were designed by Stuart Stockdale at Jaeger. 

The re-opening of the palace occurred in time for the Diamond Jubilee of Queen Elizabeth II in 2012. Visitors now can choose four different routes throughout the palace that offer exhibits incorporating cutting-edge digital presentations, interactive experiences, and audio sequences that bring to life the gatherings of gowns, antique furniture, and other memorabilia of notable residents of the palace. These include William and Mary in the Queen's State Apartments, the court of George I and II in the King's State Apartments, and the life of Queen Victoria in the rooms most associated with her.

The fourth exhibit displays selections of Queen Elizabeth's wardrobe in the 1950s, Princess Margaret from the 1960 and 70s and Diana, Princess of Wales in the 1980s during their fashion heyday. The grounds of the palace were renovated with enhancements including eliminating railings, fences, and shrubs that had undermined royal gardener Charles Bridgeman's original landscaping. Two new public gardens to the south and east of the palace were installed that connect the property to Kensington Gardens.

The nearest tube stations are Queensway, Bayswater, High Street Kensington, or (slightly farther) Gloucester Road.

In October 2011, Disney, in cooperation with Historic Royal Palaces, hosted "Rapunzel's Royal Celebration" at Kensington Palace, a special event in which Rapunzel (Tangled) was inducted as the tenth official Disney Princess and crowned. All nine existing Princesses attended – Snow White, Cinderella, Aurora (Sleeping Beauty), Ariel (The Little Mermaid), Belle (Beauty and the Beast), Jasmine (Aladdin), Pocahontas, Mulan and Tiana (The Princess and the Frog) – arriving by carriage in a procession that passed through Hyde Park. Other Disney characters who attended were the Fairy Godmother and Flynn Rider, who crowned Rapunzel. An estimated 10,000 people watched the procession, and over 100 girls from 25 countries attended the ceremony inside the palace. It was the second Disney Princess induction/coronation to take place outside the Disney Parks and Resorts, and the first to take place outside the United States.

See also

 Kensington Gardens
 Kensington Palace Gardens
 List of Baroque residences
 List of British royal residences

References

Further reading

External links

 Official website
 Bibliography recommended by Historic Royal Palaces

 
1605 establishments in England
Houses completed in 1605
Palaces in London
Houses in the Royal Borough of Kensington and Chelsea
Historic house museums in London
Kensington Gardens
Museums in the Royal Borough of Kensington and Chelsea
Grade I listed buildings in the Royal Borough of Kensington and Chelsea
Grade I listed palaces
Country houses in London
Royal residences in the Royal Borough of Kensington and Chelsea
Christopher Wren buildings in London
Nicholas Hawksmoor buildings
English Baroque architecture
Historic Royal Palaces
William III of England
Baroque palaces
Caroline of Ansbach
Anne, Queen of Great Britain
Prince George of Denmark